Pristimantis lirellus is a species of frog in the family Strabomantidae.
It is endemic to Peru.
Its natural habitat is tropical moist lowland forests.
It is threatened by habitat loss.

References

lirellus
Amphibians of Peru
Endemic fauna of Peru
Amphibians described in 1995
Taxonomy articles created by Polbot